Marasmiellus ramealis is a species of mushroom-forming fungus of the family Marasmiaceae.

External links

Fungi described in 1788
Marasmiaceae